The McKay Formation is a geologic formation in Oregon. It preserves fossils dating back to the Tortonian to Zanclean stages  (Hemphillian) of the Neogene period.

Fossil content 

The following fossils have been reported from the formation:

Mammals 
Rodents
 Cricetidae
 Antecalomys cf. valensis
 Basirepomys pliocenicus
 Copemys esmeraldensis
 Peromyscus antiquus
 Prosomys mimus
 Aplodontidae
 Liodontia sp.
 Sciuridae
 Parapaenemarmota oregonensis
 Spermophilus mckayensis
 S. wilsoni
 Neotamias sp.
 Eomyidae
 Leptodontomys oregonensis
 Geomyidae
 Parapliosaccomys oregonensis
 Perognathinae indet.
 Dipodomyinae indet.
 Heteromyidae
 Oregonomys sargenti
 Castoridae
 Castor sp.
 Dipoides smithi
 Mylagaulidae
 Hesperogaulus wilsoni
 Zapodidae
 Pliozapus solus
 Leporidae
 Hypolagus oregonensis
 Ochotonidae
 Ochotona spanglei

Lipotyphla
 Talpidae
 Gaillardia thomsoni
 ?Neurotrichus columbianus
 Scapanus cf. proceridens
 Scapanus sp.
 ?Scalopoides sp.

Perissodactyla
 Rhinocerotidae
 Teleoceras hicksi
 Equidae
 Hipparionini indet.

 Chiroptera indet.

Carnivora
 Mustelidae
 Plesiogulo marshalli
 Pliotaxidea nevadensis
 Mustela sp.
 Canidae
 Epicyon saevus
 Eucyon davisi
 Felidae
 Lynx longignathus
 Machairodus sp.

Proboscidea
 Mammutidae
 ?Mammutidae indet.

Artiodactyls
 Tayassuidae
 Platygonus brachirostris
 Camelidae
 Camelidae indet.

Birds 
 Scolopacidae	
 Bartramia umatilla
 Odontophoridae	
 Callipepla shotwelli
 Anatidae
 Nettion bunkeri

See also 
 List of fossiliferous stratigraphic units in Oregon
 Paleontology in Oregon

References

Bibliography 
 

Neogene geology of Oregon
Miocene Series of North America
Messinian
Tortonian
Pliocene Series of North America
Hemphillian
Zanclean
Sandstone formations of the United States
Tuff formations
Lacustrine deposits
Paleontology in Oregon
Formations